Leucine-rich repeat neuronal protein 2 is a protein that in humans is encoded by the LRRN2 gene.

The protein encoded by this gene belongs to the leucine-rich repeat superfamily. This gene was found to be amplified and overexpressed in malignant gliomas. The encoded protein has homology with other proteins that function as cell-adhesion molecules or as signal transduction receptors and is a candidate for the target gene in the 1q32.1 amplicon in malignant gliomas. Two alternatively spliced transcript variants encoding the same protein have been described for this gene.

References

Further reading